At least two vessels have been named William Lee:

  was launched in 1831 in Hull as a whaler in the Northern Whale Fishery. Her owners sold her in 1836 after six whaling voyages and she traded more widely, to Russia, Calcutta, and North America. She was wrecked in December 1847.
  was a bark of 311 tons (bm), built as a whaler in 1836. She is mentioned in Melville's poem as the Lee. She ended up being sunk in the Stone fleet.

Citations

Ship names